Gura Sonigara is a small village in Rajasthan, India.

Villages in Pali district